Anthony is an unincorporated community located within Lebanon Township in Hunterdon County, New Jersey, United States.

History
In the late 18th century, Anthony had a school located within the home of its teacher, John Forrester.

Anthony had a post office by 1879.

In 1882, Anthony had a population of 98.

References

Lebanon Township, New Jersey
Unincorporated communities in Hunterdon County, New Jersey
Unincorporated communities in New Jersey